The Pittsburgh Penguins are a team in the National Hockey League.

1999–present

The current structure of the Penguins' farm system has been in place since 1999.  The Penguins did not own a minor league team until 1999 when the Wilkes-Barre/Scranton Penguins of the American Hockey League were developed.

1973–1999
Between 1973 and 1999, the Penguins organization contained minor league affiliates inside of the American Hockey League, International Hockey League, ECHL and United Hockey League.

1967–1973
Initially, the Penguins organization contained minor league affiliates inside of the AHL, IHL, Central Hockey League and the low-level minor professional North American Hockey League.

References

External links
 Pittsburgh Penguins Minor League Affiliates – Hockey Database

Minor league affiliates
 
Penguins minor league affiliates